Aye Ko (born 7 August 1963) is a painter and former political prisoner from Myanmar. He is  one of Myanmar's most profiled contemporary artists internationally. On 10 January  2017, he received the 2017 Joseph Balestier Award for the Freedom of Art. He is one of the founders of New Zero Art Space.

Biography
Aye Ko was born on 7 August 1963 in Patheingyi, Myanmar . Under the master artist, U Min Soe, he trained in classic and traditional painting . In 1990, he was arrested and sentenced to three-year prison about student revolution and the underground movement for democracy. In 2008, He founded New Zero Art Space with his colleagues.

References

Burmese politicians
People from Mandalay Region
Living people
1963 births
Burmese painters
Burmese performance artists